Sinitovo is a village in central Bulgaria. It is located 5 km. east of Pazardzhik. As of 2005 the population was 2160. The main products grown in the area include wheat, maize, peppers, while the most spread domestic animal is the sheep.

The village is mentioned in Ottoman documents from 1576, 1607, 1696. There is a kindergarten, school, chitalishte and a church "Sv. Georgi" from 1884. Many Roman artifacts are found in the vicinity of the village, including marble statues and a bust of a Roman Emperor. There are ruins of Roman fortress erected by Justinian and the important Thracian settlement Bessapara, the Βεσούπαρον of Procopius.

Honours 
Sinitevo Gap in Graham Land, Antarctica is named after the village.

References 

Villages in Pazardzhik Province